Kalkee is a locality in the Wimmera region of Victoria, Australia.

The area consists of flat cropping and grazing farmland.  Kalkee has an Australian Rules football team and a netball team.  Cricket and tennis are also played at the Kalkee Recreation Reserve.  The adjacent Blue Ribbon Speedway holds motorsports events attracting crowds from the entire Wimmera region.  Kalkee once had a Primitive Methodist church and a primary school but have since closed due to a lack of population.

References

Towns in Victoria (Australia)
Rural City of Horsham
Wimmera